Broadview is a suburb of Adelaide, South Australia. It is located in the City of Port Adelaide Enfield and the City of Prospect.

History
The suburb was laid out in 1915 by C. H. Angas and K. D. Bowman.

Broadview Post Office did not open until 20 November 1945 and closed in 1987.

Geography
Broadview lies astride Regency Road and has Hampstead Road as its eastern boundary.

Demographics

The 2006 Census by the Australian Bureau of Statistics counted 3,597 persons in Broadview on census night. Of these, 46.4% were male and 53.6% were female.

The majority of residents (74.8%) are of Australian birth, with an additional 4.3% identifying England as their country of birth.

The age distribution of Broadview residents is similar to that of the greater Australian population. 70.9% of residents were over 25 years in 2006, compared to the Australian average of 66.5%; and 29.1% were younger than 25 years, compared to the Australian average of 33.5%.

Facilities and attractions

Parks
Broadview Oval is located between Collingrove Avenue and McInnes Avenue and includes a playground and croquet lawns which are the home to the Broadview Croquet Club. The oval is the home ground for the Broadview Football Club, the "Tigers", who play in the Adelaide Footy League and SANFL Juniors. Adjacent to the oval and croquet lawns are tennis courts which is the home of the Broadview Tennis Club.

Transportation

Roads
The suburb is serviced by Regency Road and by Hampstead Road, which forms its eastern boundary.

Public transport
Broadview is serviced by public transport run by the Adelaide Metro.

See also
List of Adelaide suburbs

References

External links

Suburbs of Adelaide
Populated places established in 1915